Samy may refer to:

Samy (director) (active from 2006), Tamil film director
Samy (XSS), a computer worm
Samy (Mobile Marketing)

Sami (disambiguation)